Anna Zaiachkivska (born 12 December 1991) is a Ukrainian model and beauty pageant titleholder who represented her country in the Miss World 2013 pageant.

Life and career
Zayachkivska is from Ivano-Frankivsk, in Ukraine. At the time of her participation at the Miss World 2013 pageant, she was a fourth-year student at the Art Institute of Vasyl Stefanyk Ciscarpathian National University, majoring in religious art. Zayachkivska was a volunteer (serving hot coffee and tea to the protesters, working in the medical center, and administering the Maydanneeds.com website) during the late 2013/early 2014 Euromaidan protests.

References

External links
 Эксклюзивное интервью первой красавицы Украины (фото) (Hanna Zayachkivska. Interview (photo))].  August 3, 2013.-->
 Lutchyn, Maria. Interview of the firtka.if.ua with Miss Ukraine-2013 Anna Zayachkivska. April 4, 2013.
 Міс Україна-2013 стала франківчанка Ганна Заячківська (фото) (Miss Ukraine-2013 became a native of Frankivsk Hanna Zayachkivska (photo)) . Prykarpatska Pravda. March 31, 2013.
 Kotsaba, Ruslan. Anna Zayachkivska will become Miss World 2013 (video). Outlook (TV program). "ZIK". April 8, 2013.

1991 births
Living people
Miss World 2013 delegates
Ukrainian female models
Ukrainian beauty pageant winners
People from Ivano-Frankivsk
Ukrainian artists
Vasyl Stefanyk Subcarpathian National University alumni
People of the Euromaidan